The 1942 United States Senate election in Michigan was held on November 2, 1942. Incumbent Democratic U.S. Senator Prentiss M. Brown ran for re-election to second term in office, but was defeated by Republican Homer S. Ferguson.

Republican primary

Candidates
Elton R. Eaton, State Representative from Plymouth
Homer S. Ferguson, Wayne County Circuit Court Judge
Gerald L. K. Smith, minister and founder of the defunct Union Party

Results

General election

Results

See also 
 1942 United States Senate elections

References 

1942
Michigan
United States Senate